Dermatocarpon tomentulosum is a species of lichen belonging to the family Verrucariaceae. A rare species, it is known only to a few localities in North America—Missouri and Texas in the United States, and Cat Island and New Providence in the Bahamas.

References 

Verrucariales 
Lichen species
Lichens described in 2006